Sadashiv Narayan Patankar (?-1941) was an Indian producer, director, and cameraman. Referred to as "one of the early pioneers of Indian Cinema", his influence is stated to be equal to that of Dadasaheb Phalke. He was one of a wide range of people who filmed the historic Delhi Durbar in 1911 held for King George V, Emperor of India. The Durbar was also filmed by Madan and Hiralal Shah, another professional photographer from Bombay.

Patankar initially teamed up with V. P. Divekar and A. P. Karandikar, with the renowned freedom fighter and Nationalist leader, Lokmanya Tilak, helping them in getting finance from Bhagwandas Chaturbhuj and Dharamdas Narayandas, two well-established financiers. Their debut production in 1912, Savitri, directed by Patankar was unsuccessful. The three formed a production company called Patankar Union in 1913. They produced The Death Of Narayanrao Peshwa also called The Murder Of Narayanrao Peshwa in 1915, which has been cited as the first historical film of Indian cinema, as well as the mythological Ram Vanvas (The Exile Of Rama) (1918).

Patankar went on to form Patankar Friends and Company with Dwarkadas Sampat who had joined them in 1917, producing and directing Kach-Devyani (1920). He also worked as an actor in films like Mahashweta Kadambari (1922), Videhi Janak (1923), and Vaman Avatar (1923), which were directed by him. In a career-span of fifteen years covering 1912-1926, he made over forty films.

According to Rajadhyaksha and Willemen, Patankar's "historicals and mythologicals were among the most professionally made films before the studio era (pre-1925)".

Career
Born in the early 1880s, he worked as "a decorator in Chitre's Coronation Cinema in Bombay". His interest in still photography led him to purchase a film camera from H. S. Bhatavdekar, a professional photographer in Bombay. One of his early works along with V.P. Divekar and A.P. Karandikar,  using Bhatavdekar 's camera, was filming the famed Delhi Durbar in 1911. This was held in Delhi, India to commemorate the coronation of King George V. They also filmed the funeral of Lokmanya Tilak in 1920.

He formed a partnership with V.P. Divekar, A.P. Karandikar, Ranade and  Bhatkhande to set up the production company called Patankar Union. Their initial production Savitri, a "hundred-foot-long film and produced in 1912", was a washout as the film came out blank. In 1915 they produced Murder Of Narayanrao Peshwa, which was directed by Patankar. The film is cited as one of the first historical film made in India. Patankar went on to be the cinematographer as well as the director for all his films.

Patankar's association with Dwarkadas Sampat in 1917, led to the formation of his second production company called Patankar Friends and Company from 1918 to 1920, with scripts written by Mohanlal Dave. Patankar's first film with this company, King Shriyal, was released in 1918. He made Ram Vanvas or Exile of Lord Rama (1918) in four parts, thus making it the first Indian serial. KachDevyani (1920), directed and photographed by Patankar, had a Gujarati milieu, with traditional and folk dances incorporated in the film. Instead of using male actors in female roles as was the norm, Sampat organised two girls from Calcutta to play female lead.

Sampat and Patankar separated soon by 1920, due to disagreements and Patankar started a third studio, National Film (1922), which was financed by Thakurdas Vakil and Harilal. He then set up a fourth production house called Pioneer Films with the help of Vazir Haji, who financed him.

Filmography
List of films:

References

External links
 

Cinema pioneers
Hindi film producers
Year of birth unknown
20th-century Indian film directors
Hindi-language film directors
1941 deaths